Murat Ali Dulupçu (born May 24, 1971) is a Turkish economist at the Süleyman Demirel University.

Biography
Murat Ali Dulupcu attended the Isparta Anatolian High School in Isparta. He graduated from Istanbul University in 1989 with a Bachelor of Arts in Economics and from Suleyman Demirel University in 1995 with a  M.A. in Economics. He completed his Ph.D. in Regional Science at Kütahya Dumlupınar University.

Dulupcu is a member of board of directors at Lakes District Technocity. He is a partner and representative of Suleyman Demirel University in EURODITE project. He is also a partner in EUROLAB project.
He was the reporter for 9th Development Plan (2007–2013) of Turkey.

Publications
 Dulupçu, M.(2005) "Regionalization for Turkey: An Illusion or a cure?", European Urban and Regional Studies, vol. 13: pp. 280 – 281
 Dulupçu, M.(2006) "Turkey and the EU, A Glittering Prize or a Millstone?", European Urban and Regional Studies,vol. 12: pp. 99 – 115 
 Dulupçu, M.(2002). "Accommodating Turkey in New Regionalism" Centre for Regional and Urban Studies, University of Birmingham Press

References

External links
 

Süleyman Demirel University alumni
1971 births
Turkish economists
Regional economists
Living people
Istanbul University alumni
Kütahya Dumlupınar University alumni
Academic staff of Süleyman Demirel University